La Fregeneda is a municipality of Spain located in the province of Salamanca, Castile and León. As of 2016 the municipality has a population of 337 inhabitants.

See also 
 Fregeneda–Almendra pegmatitic field

References

Municipalities in the Province of Salamanca